Calliostoma sublaeve is a species of sea snail, a marine gastropod mollusk in the family Calliostomatidae.

Description
The size of the shell varies between 25 mm and 40 mm.

Distribution
This marine species occurs off India, Sri Lanka and the Andaman Islands at depths between 80 m and 640 m.

References

External links
 

sublaeve
Gastropods described in 1895